Ride the Cyclone is a musical with music, lyrics and book by Jacob Richmond and Brooke Maxwell. It is the second installment in Richmond's "Uranium Teen Scream Trilogy," a collection of three theatrical works, one not yet written, that take place in the exaggerated Uranium City.

It tells the story of the members of the St. Cassian High School chamber choir of Uranium City, Saskatchewan, who perish on a faulty roller coaster called "The Cyclone". Each tells a story to win the reward of a mechanical fortune teller — the chance to return to life.

Productions 
The world premiere production took place in Victoria, British Columbia at Atomic Vaudeville in 2008. A production played at the Theatre Passe Muraille, Toronto in 2011, and there was a tour of Western Canada in 2013.

The American premiere took place at the Chicago Shakespeare Theater. Directed by Rachel Rockwell, the production opened on 29 September 2015, playing a limited run until 8 November. With Rockwell again directing, the show opened Off-Broadway at the Lucille Lortel Theatre with an official opening night on 30 November 2016, ending its limited run on 18 December. Taylor Louderman was initially cast in the production but withdrew during previews, citing creative differences. She was replaced by original Chicago company member Tiffany Tatreau. The cast also included Alex Wyse. Charles Isherwood of The New York Times praised the show, stating "this delightfully weird and just plain delightful show... will provide the kind of thrills we look for in all musical comedies, however outlandish their subject matter: an engaging and varied score, knocked out of the park by a superlative cast, and a supremely witty book." The same production went to Seattle in 2018 at the 5th Avenue Theatre. Following the death of original director/choreographer Rachel Rockwell, a production based on Rockwell's direction opened at the Alliance Theatre in Atlanta in 2019, directed by Leora Morris and featuring much of the same cast and creative team.

The show is making its California premiere at Chance Theater in Anaheim, CA as of 2023.

Plot
The musical opens with the voice of a mysterious girl in a school uniform, singing a song of an unending dream-like state ("Dream of Life").

Karnak, a mechanical fortune teller automaton, introduces himself as the show's narrator ("Welcome..."). Karnak tells the audience that he was formerly able to predict the exact moment of a person's death, but the carnival set him to "Family Fun Novelty Mode," meaning that he could only repeat vague predictions and fairground advertising. Karnak reveals that he will die soon, as a rat he has named Virgil has been gradually chewing through the rubber of his power cable, and will soon bite down on 200 volts of electricity, instantly killing both of them. "As there is nothing more base than death," Virgil is enlisted to play the bass.

Karnak has constructed this show as a final apology.

Some time before the fairground went under, Karnak felt immense guilt following the deaths of five teenagers from the former mining town of Uranium City, Saskatchewan who had their fortunes read, though his settings prevented him from warning them of impending doom. Conjuring them back from the dead, Karnak introduces the St. Cassian Chamber Choir and recounts their death on a malfunctioning rollercoaster, the Cyclone ("The Uranium Suite"). The five teens arrive in limbo, and Karnak informs them of their demise. Each of the five teens is introduced and given "catchphrases." Karnak then announces the teens are in a literal game of life and death, where they all must compete for the chance to be returned to the world of the living. Karnak reads out a prophecy: "Whoever wants to win it the most shall redeem the loser in order to complete the whole."

A sixth victim, the "mystery contestant" dubbed Jane Doe by the coroner, is introduced- the same girl from the top of the show. Since no family came to claim her body when it was found headless- and Karnak never read her fortune- her identity is unknown ("Jane Doe's Entrance"). In the off-Broadway staging, it is suggested that Jane has replaced her head with that of a doll, whose body she carries around with her. Jane's entrance frightens the other choir members, but following her entrance, Karnak announces the competition will begin.

The first contestant is Ocean O’Connell Rosenberg, a perfectionist over-achiever. As a child of "far-left of center humanists," Ocean always felt like the self-proclaimed "white sheep" of the family. She tells Karnak that she "has seen enough reality TV" to know what he wants her to do. She proceeds to sing a song themed around her own self-importance and ego, comparing herself to the other teens and pointing out how they all fall short compared to her. She believes she is the only one worth bringing back to life, as she has the highest chance of succeeding in the world ("What the World Needs"). After her song ends, Karnak reveals that the choice of who lives will be made by group consensus. Though Ocean clumsily attempts to take back her words, the rest of the choir- including her best friend, Constance- has been incredibly offended by her social Darwinist rant.

The next contestant is Noel Gruber, the only gay boy in his small town who dreams of being a cold-hearted French prostitute, but was instead stuck working at a Taco Bell. He sings about his desire to live the tragic, loveless life of his alter ego, "Monique Gibeau" (inspired by Marlene Dietrich in The Blue Angel), who dies of typhoid flu at the end of the song ("Noel's Lament"). After his song, Ocean expresses annoyance that his song did not have a moral. She insists that every story has a lesson ("Every Story's Got a Lesson") and gets Constance to perform a (pre-scripted) anti-drug improv PSA with her, though it soon becomes clear that Constance's dark sense of humor is antithetical to how Ocean wants her to be.

The third contestant is Mischa Bachinski, a Ukrainian adoptee who immigrated after his mother, dying from radiation poisoning while on a Chernobyl disaster clean-up crew, put him up for adoption and lied about his age. When he reached Canada, his adoptive parents were expecting a "recently potty-trained" two-year-old, but instead received a violent teenage boy with a drinking problem. To cope with the isolating treatment he received from his adoptive parents, he turned to "self-aggrandizing commercialized hip-hop," posting his own original raps to YouTube. His song begins as a gangsta rap track that heavily relies on autotune before transitioning into a passionate Ukrainian love ballad to his online girlfriend whom he met through his YouTube comment section ("This Song Is Awesome" & "Talia").

The fourth contestant is Ricky Potts, a boy who was born with an unnamed degenerative disease that left him mute and unable to walk (as of the 2023 version of the script, Ricky no longer has a degenerative disease and is only mute because of trauma). To combat this, Ricky developed complex fantasies to retreat into, particularly his own "religion," in which he is the savior of a race of sentient, anthropomorphic cats from a distant galaxy ("Space Age Bachelor Man"). In the off-Broadway script, he concedes his chance of being resurrected, but this was removed in later versions.

While the teens sing about their hopes, dreams, and fantasies, Jane Doe sings about her own despair ("The Ballad of Jane Doe"). Jane's headless body was found in the wreckage, and though she was assumed to be a member of the choir, her body went unclaimed and her identity remained unknown following the stress-induced death of their choir director later that day. Her spirit has no memory of who she was and no idea what will happen to her in the afterlife. After hearing Jane's tale, the choir rallies together and holds a birthday party for her featuring a rewritten birthday song, sharing a tender moment with each other ("The New Birthday Song").

While Ricky bonds with Jane by giving her one of the names he had been "saving up" in life, and Noel and Mischa connect over seeing each other as they want to be seen, Ocean and Constance finally come to a head. Ocean, still desperate to return to life, hurts Constance deeply in her own self-obsession. Constance, fed up with being Ocean's sidekick, finally stands up for herself by punching Ocean- albeit hitting her in the boob.

Finally taking her turn, Constance reveals that, just three hours prior to the accident, she had lost her virginity to a carnie in a port-o-potty to "just get it out of the way." Frustrated with her image as the "nicest girl in town," Constance speaks of her family's pride for living and working in Uranium City that resulted in her always being seen as lame and unambitious- a "lifer." Feeling guilt for how she resented her parents, she recalls the moment the coaster derailed, and how all her anger and misconceptions had dropped away. She sings of her love for her life and her town ("Sugar Cloud"). Ocean apologizes, "as if seeing her friend for the first time."

At last, it is time for the final vote. Karnak randomly changes the rules, telling Ocean that she alone will get the deciding vote because she has the highest Grade Point Average. Having a crisis of conscience, she refuses to vote for herself. Recalling Karnak's prophecy, she realizes that Jane is the only one who doesn't have memories to take to the afterlife with her. The choir collectively decides to send Jane back. Jane goes through the portal and Karnak reveals that she was Penny Lamb (a character in Richmond's play LEGOLAND). Whether she returns to life as Penny or starts a new life is left ambiguous. We see a compilation of home movies of her new life from youth to old age ("It's Not a Game"). Virgil finally tears through the rubber, killing himself and Karnak before the latter can give his final piece of insight. As Karnak dies, he says the same fairground advertising he told the teens before they rode the Cyclone: "Your lucky number is seven. You will soar to great heights. Be sure to ride the Cyclone."

The remaining teens unite and sing an uplifting song ("It's Just a Ride") as their spirits travel to whatever comes next.

Characters 

 The Amazing Karnak - A mechanical fortune-telling machine that serves as the narrator and game master
 Ocean O'Connell Rosenberg - A competitive over-achiever who struggles to put others before herself
 Noel Gruber - The only gay man in Uranium who has an obsession with French New Wave cinema
 Mischa Bachinski - A Ukrainian adoptee who puts on a gangster persona to conceal his passionate nature
 Ricky Potts - A mute boy with a degenerative disease and an overactive imagination
 Jane Doe/Penny Lamb - A decapitated girl who is unsure of her true identity
 Constance Blackwood - The secretly self-loathing "nicest girl in town" who has complicated feelings about her hometown
Virgil - The rat chewing through Karnak’s power cable

Cut characters from earlier versions of the show include Trishna, a shy nerdy girl who was into entomology (played by Almeera Jiwa), Astrid, Ocean's Ukrainian cousin (played by Celine Stubel), Astrid's boyfriend Hank (played by Tim Johnson), Corey Ross (played by Carey Wass), and others, who eventually became the characters of Mischa and Ricky.

Musical numbers
  "Karnak's Dream of Life" – Jane Doe

  "The Uranium Suite" – Ensemble

  "Jane Doe's Entrance" – Ensemble
  "What the World Needs" – Ocean O’Connell Rosenberg and Ensemble
  "Noel's Lament" – Noel Gruber and Ensemble

  "Every Story's Got a Lesson" - Ensemble 
  "This Song is Awesome" – Mischa Bachinski and Ensemble
  "Talia" – Mischa Bachinski and Ensemble

  "Space Age Bachelor Man" – Ricky Potts and Ensemble
  "The Ballad of Jane Doe" – Jane Doe and Ensemble
  "The New Birthday Song" – Ensemble 
  "Sugar Cloud" – Constance Blackwood and Ensemble
  "It's Not a Game / It's Just a Ride" – Ensemble

Notes
 The Uranium Suite, the show's current opening number, is featured in the 2019 Atlanta production of the show, the World Premiere Cast Recording, and all productions onwards. In the 2016 Off-Broadway and 2015 Chicago versions of the show, this song's spot was held by "Fall Fair Suite." In the 2018 Seattle production, this song was replaced by "Waiting For The Drop." In the original Canadian productions, this song was originally a combination of The Uranium Suite and a song called "Tragic Fact."
 A World Premiere Cast Recording, also referred to by Richmond and Maxwell as a "concept album", was released digitally on May 7, 2021, featuring the 2019 Atlanta production cast (minus Karl Hamilton, who was replaced with writer Jacob Richmond in the role of Karnak) and several cut songs. It also features Karnak breaking the fourth wall several times, addressing the listener under the context of an album instead of the show.
 Initially, Ocean's song was called "Play to Win", and was more of a Gospel style song as opposed to the pop style of "What the World Needs". It was cut from the show, but there are still snippets of the song available on YouTube and SoundCloud, alongside the original "The Ballad of Jane Doe," "Sugar Cloud", "The Uranium Suite / Tragic Fact" and "Space Age Bachelor Man".
 "Noel's Lament" originally included a section in which Monique, Noel's alter ego, conceived a child with an unnamed lover, which she then sold to two Romani traveling merchants. This was cut during previews of the 2016 production onwards. This version is also available on SoundCloud.
 During the 2018 Seattle production, a song named "Be Safe, Be Good" took the place of the song "It's Not a Game / It's Just a Ride", although "It's Not a Game / It's Just a Ride" would return for the 2019 Atlanta production. In the memory of Rachel Rockwell, the original director of the show who passed away in 2018, the song was featured in the World Premiere Cast Recording, since she was very fond of the song. It was retitled "Be Safe, Be Good (For Rachel)" and was sung by co-writer Brooke Maxwell and the rest of the cast.

Cast

Awards and nominations

References

Off-Broadway musicals
One-act musicals
Canadian musicals
Original musicals
2008 musicals
LGBT-related musicals